Tomosvaryella minima is a species of fly in the family Pipunculidae.

Distribution
Austria, Belgium, Great Britain, Bulgaria, Canary Islands, Croatia, Czech Republic, Denmark, Finland, France, Germany, Hungary, Italy, Crete, Latvia, Romania, Slovakia, Slovenia, Spain, Switzerland, Netherlands.

References

Pipunculidae
Insects described in 1898
Diptera of Europe
Taxa named by Theodor Becker